Mambalgins are peptides found in the venom of the black mamba (Dendroaspis polylepis polylepis), an elapid snake. Mambalgins are members of the three-finger toxin (3FTx) protein family and have the characteristic three-finger protein fold. First reported by French researchers in 2012, mambalgins are unusual members of the 3FTx family in that they have the in vivo effect of causing analgesia without apparent toxicity. Their mechanism of action is potent inhibition of acid-sensing ion channels.

Structure 
Mambalgins known to date consist of 57 amino acid residues and fold into a characteristic three-finger toxin (3FTx) structure. Two isoforms were originally described, called mambalgin-1 and mambalgin-2, which differ by a single amino acid residue. A third variant which differs by a single residue at another site, has subsequently been reported from venom profiling of the Eastern green mamba (Dendroaspis augusticeps).

The X-ray structure of mambalgin-1 has been solved and consists of a three-finger protein fold with the typical three beta sheet-containing "finger" loops emanating from a central core stabilized by disulphide bonds; however, the structure differs from most 3FTx proteins in having an elongated second loop and shortened first and third loops. Mambalgins have relatively low sequence similarity to other 3FTx proteins and are most closely related to the 3FTx subclass known as the non-conventional or "weak" toxins.

Function 
Mambalgins are potent inhibitors of acid-sensing ion channels (ASICs), which are multimeric membrane proteins that respond to low pH and whose activation is thought to be involved in perception of pain. Mambalgins have been shown to interact specifically with ASIC subtypes present in the central nervous system (homomeric ASIC1a and heteromeric ASIC1a/ASIC2a or ASIC1a/ASIC2b), as well as those found in sensory neurons (ASIC1b and ASIC1a/ASIC1b). They have no effect on other ASICs or on other types of ion channel proteins. These interactions are likely mediated in part by mambalgins' positive electrostatic potential facilitating binding to negatively charged ASICs. Mambalgins are believed to trap ASICs in a closed conformation.

In tests performed on laboratory mice, mambalgins have the in vivo effect of analgesia without the toxic effects seen with most 3FTx proteins, and in particular, without the clinical manifestations associated with inhibition of nicotinic acetylcholine receptors, the targets of most 3FTx proteins including mambalgins' closest relatives. Furthermore, the analgesic effects of mambalgins does not confer side effects such as respiratory depression and drug tolerance, both associated with opioid analgesics.

In addition to mambalgins, at least three other peptides from three different taxa have been identified as interacting with ASICs: PcTx1, from the South American tarantula Psalmopoeus cambridgei; APETx2, from the sea anemone Anthopleura elegantissima; and MitTx, a heterodimer from the snake Micrurus tener tener. PcTx1 and APETx2, like mambalgins, are ASIC inhibitors, albeit with different subtype specificities; MitTx is an activator associated with causing pain in vivo. The four proteins have no detectable sequence similarity. The natural function of ASIC-inhibiting analgesic peptides is unclear, as all are produced by predator animals yet have no known toxic effects on the corresponding prey.

Applications
In laboratory experiments using laboratory mice, mambalgins appear to exert clinically significant analgesic effects without the side effects typically associated with opioid analgesics. Although this property has attracted interest as a basis for development of pharmaceutical drugs, mambalgins or their derivatives are not in clinical use.

References

External links 

Vertebrate toxins